10 Hudson Yards, also known as the South Tower, is an office building that was completed in 2016 in Manhattan's West Side. Located near Hell's Kitchen, Chelsea and the Penn Station area, the building is a part of the Hudson Yards urban renewal project, a plan to redevelop the Metropolitan Transportation Authority's West Side Yard. Coach, Inc. is the anchor tenant. During planning, the tower was known as Tower C.

History

Construction 

Groundbreaking for 10 Hudson Yards occurred on December 4, 2012, with a provisional completion date of 2016. Foundation work continued through the first half of 2013 and the superstructure work began on the tower in August 2013. The contract to construct the tower was awarded to a subsidiary of Tutor Perini in March 2013. The tower is the first tower in the Hudson Yards complex to have been completed, because it is the only Hudson Yards tower not on the artificial platform over the West Side Yards.

, 10 Hudson Yards was 27 stories tall. , thirty-two of the tower's 52 floors had been completed. , 10 Hudson Yards had topped out. The tower was opened on May 31, 2016, with the first 300 Coach, Inc. employees moving into the building. As of November 2022, 10 Hudson Yards was the 49th-tallest building in the United States.

The southern facade of 10 Hudson Yards cantilevers over the 30th Street spur of the High Line, and one of the building's entrances is to be located on the High Line. The architectural firm who designed 10 Hudson Yards was Kohn Pedersen Fox. Thornton Tomasetti was the structural engineer; Jaros, Baum & Bolles performed the MEP engineering; and Langan served as lead civil engineer.

Occupancy
The first tenants were signed in April 2013. The company purchased their space in a complex transaction with Related. Tapestry paid more than $750 million for space in the new building while simultaneously selling their nearby headquarters at 516 West 34th Street. This allowed Related to erect portions of 50 Hudson Yards and the Hudson Park and Boulevard on the site. Coach's space includes a 15-story atrium, double height conference rooms overlooking the High Line, a private cafeteria, and a large terrace with views of the Hudson River. Coach was the first tenant to move into the new building on May 31, 2016. In September 2017, Coach subleased  of space to The Guardian Life Insurance Company of America.

In total, the building was designed to accommodate over 7,000 employees. VaynerMedia occupies the building's 25th floor.

There will also be retail space at street level adjacent to the retail building immediately to the north of 10 Hudson Yards. That building will be designed by Elkus Manfredi Architects. Fairway, a locally based grocer, was expected to build a store in the lower floors of the building, occupying . Additionally, Spanish chef José Andrés will operate a  food hall named Mercado Little Spain which will contain a wine bar, a cocktail bar, and 15 kiosks serving different kinds of tapas. An outpost of fast casual salad restaurant Sweetgreen opened in August 2018 in the base of the tower.

Ownership

10 Hudson Yards was initially owned by the master developers of the Hudson Yards project, Related Companies and Oxford Properties, in partnership with the Kuwait Investment Authority. Various sections of the tower were sold to tenants as office condos, with Coach purchasing their space for $750 million prior to construction. In August 2016, Coach sold their stake in the tower to Allianz for $420 million. The deal gave Allianz 44% ownership and valued the building at $2.15 billion. In May 2018, the State Teachers Retirement System of Ohio purchased roughly 20% of the tower for $432 million at a similar valuation.

Gallery

See also 
 List of tallest buildings in New York City
 Hudson Yards Redevelopment Project

References

Further reading
 Arak, Joey. "Brookfield Properties Goes Splittsville" on Curbed.com (November 19, 2007)
 Chaban, Matt. "Scaling the Towers of Hudson Yards" in The New York Observer (July 12, 2011)
 Davidson, Justin. "From 0 to 12 Million Square Feet" New York (October 7, 2012).
 Samtani, Hiten. "Anatomy of a deal: Inside Related/Oxford’s unusual financing of Hudson Yards" in The Real Deal (August 16, 2013)
 Sheftell, Jason. "New York City officials, developers to break ground on $15 billion mini-city Hudson Yards" New York Daily News (December 4, 2012)

External links 

 Hudson Yards
 New York City project website
 Related Companies project website
 Animation: building the platform while trains run through Brookfield properties, via Gothamist.com
 Hudson Yards news and developments

Chelsea, Manhattan
Hudson Yards, Manhattan
Oxford Properties
Skyscraper office buildings in Manhattan
Kohn Pedersen Fox buildings
Office buildings completed in 2016
2016 establishments in New York City
Buildings developed by the Related Companies